The inferior transverse ligament (spinoglenoid ligament) is a weak membranous band, situated behind the neck of the scapula and stretching from the lateral border of the spine to the margin of the glenoid cavity.

It forms an arch under which the transverse scapular vessels and suprascapular nerve enter the infraspinatous fossa.

References

Ligaments of the upper limb